USS Groton may refer to the following ships of the United States Navy:

, was commissioned 5 September 1944 and sold to the Government of Colombia on 26 March 1947, where she served as Almirante Padilla
, was laid down as PCE-900 on 11 January 1943. She was named Groton  on 15 February 1956 and was struck from the Navy List 1 February 1960
, was commissioned 8 July 1978 and was struck from the Navy List on 7 November 1997

United States Navy ship names